Robert K. Kerlan (May 13, 1922 – September 8, 1996) was an American orthopedic surgeon and the co-founder, along with Dr. Frank Jobe, of the Kerlan-Jobe Orthopaedic Clinic. He was regarded as a pioneer in the discipline of sports medicine.

Kerlan was the Los Angeles Dodgers' first team doctor after their move from Brooklyn to Los Angeles in 1958, and diagnosed Dodgers pitcher Sandy Koufax with traumatic arthritis in his left elbow.  He also became team physician for other Los Angeles-based sports teams including the Rams, Lakers, and Kings.

Kerlan remained active in his sports medicine practice despite a long-standing case of arthritis that required him to use crutches periodically for years, and permanently after 1977.

Education  Kerlan graduated from Aitkin High School in Aitkin, Minnesota, where he was a star athlete. He started college as a basketball letterman at UCLA, but eventually gave up playing.  He graduated from Stanford Medical School in 1948 with Dr Toby Freedman. He then completed his residency with Toby in 1951 at the USC Medical Center under the direction of Dr. Max Gaspar.

In 1996 he was inducted into the Southern California Jewish Sports Hall of Fame.

Kerlan died in Santa Monica, California at age 74 in 1996. The cause of death was variously reported as heart failure  and pneumonia.

References

1948
1951

1922 births
1996 deaths
American sports physicians
Physicians from California
American orthopedic surgeons
Los Angeles Dodgers personnel
People from Aitkin, Minnesota
Stanford University School of Medicine alumni
20th-century surgeons
University of California, Los Angeles alumni